The Aspen Music Festival and School (AMFS) is a classical music festival held annually in Aspen, Colorado.

It is noted both for its concert programming and the musical training it offers to mostly young-adult music students. Founded in 1949, the typical eight-week summer season includes more than 400 classical music events—including concerts by five orchestras, solo and chamber music performances, fully staged opera productions, master classes, lectures, and children's programming—and brings in 70,000 audience members.

In the winter, the AMFS presents a small series of recitals and Metropolitan Opera Live in HD screenings.

As a training ground for young-adult classical musicians, the AMFS draws more than 650 students from 40 states and 34 countries, with an average age of 22. While in Aspen, students participate in lessons, coaching, and public performances in orchestras, operas, and chamber music, often playing side-by-side with AMFS artist-faculty.

The organization is currently led by President and CEO Alan Fletcher and Music Director Robert Spano.

History
The Aspen Music Festival and School was founded in 1949 by Chicago businessman Walter Paepcke and Elizabeth Paepcke as a two-week bicentennial celebration of the 18th-century German writer Johann Wolfgang von Goethe. The event, which included both intellectual forums and musical performances, was such a success that it led to the formation of both the Aspen Institute and the Aspen Music Festival and School.

In the summers that followed, the participating musicians returned, bringing their music students, and the foundation was set for the AMFS as it is known today. In 1950, Igor Stravinsky became the first conductor to present his own works with the Festival. The following year in 1951, the School enrolled its first official class, with 183 music students.

Early founding musicians included baritone Mack Harrell (father of cellist Lynn Harrell) and violinist Roman Totenberg (father of NPR legal correspondent Nina Totenberg). Early performance highlights include then-student James Levine conducting the Benjamin Britten opera Albert Herring in 1964, coinciding with Britten's visit to Aspen that summer to accept an award from the Aspen Institute. In 1965, Duke Ellington and his orchestra came to the AMFS to perform a benefit concert. In 1971, Dorothy DeLay joined the AMFS strings artist-faculty and attracted more than 200 students each summer to her program. In 1975, Aaron Copland came to Aspen as a composer-in-residence on the occasion of his 75th birthday. In 1980, John Denver performed with the Aspen Festival Orchestra for his TV special Music and the Mountains, which aired the following year on ABC. Multiple artist-faculty members have also recorded albums while in Aspen, including the Emerson String Quartet, which recorded the Shostakovich: The String Quartets 5-disc set from AMFS venue Harris Concert Hall and won the 2000 Grammy Award for Best Classical Album.

Music Directors

1954: William Steinberg
1955: Hans Schweiger
1956–1961: Izler Solomon
1962: Walter Susskind
1963: Szymon Goldberg
1964–1968: Walter Susskind
1970–1990: Jorge Mester
1991–1997: Lawrence Foster
1998–2009: David Zinman
2012–Present: Robert Spano

Educational programs
The Aspen Music Festival and School offers young musicians a choice of the following programs of study:

 Orchestra/Instrumental
 Strings, Winds, Brass, Percussion, Harp
 Center for Orchestral Leadership
 Chamber Music
 Center for Advanced Quartet Studies
American Brass Quintet Seminar @Aspen
 Aspen Chamber Music
 Aspen Opera Center
 Voice
 Opera Coaching
 Aspen Opera Theater and VocalARTS (Beginning 2020)
 Voice
 Opera Coaching
 Seraphic Fire Professional Choral Institute
 Solo Piano
 Collaborative Piano
 Aspen Conducting Academy
 Susan and Ford Schumann Center for Composition Studies
 Aspen Contemporary Ensemble
 Classical Guitar

Facilities

The Benedict Music Tent, which opened in 2000, is the Festival's primary concert venue and seats 2050. The tent replaced an earlier tent designed by Herbert Bayer, which in 1965 replaced the original smaller tent designed by Eero Saarinen. Concerts are held in the Benedict Music Tent on a nearly daily basis during the summer, and seating on the lawn just outside the Tent, where many choose to picnic during events, is always free. The design has open sides; the curving roof is made of Teflon-coated fiberglass, a hard material also used by the Denver International Airport.

The 500-seat Joan and Irving Harris Concert Hall is located next door to the Benedict Music Tent, and was opened in 1993 at a cost of $7 million. The Wheeler Opera House—a Victorian-era venue owned by the City of Aspen—is the home to Aspen Opera Center productions in the summer and the AMFS's Metropolitan Opera Live in HD screenings in the winter.

In 2016, the AMFS completed its $75 million, 105,000-square-foot Matthew and Carolyn Bucksbaum Campus, which serves as the center of its teaching activities. The campus, located two miles from downtown Aspen, sits on a 38-acre site that is shared between the AMFS in the summer and Aspen Country Day School during the academic year. Designed by architect Harry Teague, who also designed the AMFS's Harris Concert Hall and the Benedict Music Tent, the Bucksbaum Campus includes three expansive rehearsal halls, numerous teaching studios and practice rooms, a percussion building, administrative offices, and a glass-enclosed cafeteria. The campus was designed with Aspen's natural setting in mind: the buildings’ roof lines mirror the shapes of the surrounding mountains and hug the contours of the ponds and creek.

See also
List of classical music festivals
List of opera festivals

References

External links
Aspen Music Festival and School website
Aspen radio stream from YourClassical

 
Music schools in Colorado
Educational institutions established in 1949
Recurring events established in 1949
Opera festivals
Classical music festivals in the United States
Tourist attractions in Aspen, Colorado
Education in Pitkin County, Colorado
Music festivals in Colorado
1949 establishments in Colorado
Music festivals established in 1949
Orchestras based in Colorado